Perryville is a passenger rail station in Perryville, Maryland, served by MARC's Penn Line. The station is located on the southern part of the Northeast Corridor, between the Newark, DE and Aberdeen, MD stations. Although Amtrak does not regularly serve the station, a single Amtrak train—Northeast Regional  111—stops at Perryville to board MARC ticket holders traveling south. The station is also the northernmost in the MARC system and the terminus for the Penn Line.

History

The Perryville station was originally built by the Philadelphia, Wilmington and Baltimore Railroad in 1905 and adopted by the Pennsylvania Railroad, and is located within a wye for the PW&B's Port Deposit Branch. When Amtrak took over passenger service in 1971, the station was closed but later in the decade became a stop for the Chesapeake between Washington D.C., and Philadelphia, until it was acquired by MARC. The station was remodeled to its original specifications in 1992, and is located near an Amtrak maintenance facility.

The station also contains the Perryville Railroad Museum, open on Sunday afternoons, which includes a model train layout and exhibits about the history of railroads in Perryville.

Station layout
The station has a single side platform north of the tracks.

Future expansion
In 2017, the Wilmington Area Planning Council submitted ridership studies to Cecil County, the Delaware Valley Regional Planning Commission, SEPTA and the Delaware Department of Transportation for the extension of MARC service from Perryville via Elkton to Newark, Delaware, and possibly Wilmington. The section from Perryville to Newark is the one of only three along the Northeast Corridor not covered by commuter train service (the others are between New London, Connecticut, and Wickford Junction, Rhode Island as well as New York Penn Station and New Rochelle, New York). The Route 5 bus operated by Cecil Transit formerly connected the two stations.

References

External links
 
 Perryville Official Site, with slight info on Perryville Railroad Station & Museum
 Image from Maryland Route 7 (AARoads.com)
 Perryville Station and vicinity (RailPictures.net)

Stations on the Northeast Corridor
MARC Train stations
Former Amtrak stations in Maryland
Penn Line
Perryville, Maryland
Railroad museums in Maryland
Railway stations in the United States opened in 1905
Transportation buildings and structures in Cecil County, Maryland
Former Pennsylvania Railroad stations
Philadelphia, Wilmington and Baltimore Railroad